The 2006 Super League Grand Final was the 9th official Grand Final and conclusive and championship-deciding game of Super League XI. Held on Saturday, 14 October at Manchester's Old Trafford ground, the game was played between St. Helens, who finished top of the league after the 28 weekly rounds, and Hull FC, who finished second after the weekly rounds.

Background

Route to the Final

St Helens

Hull FC

Match details

See also
Super League XI

External links
2006 Super League Grand Final at rlphotos.com

Super League Grand Finals
St Helens R.F.C. matches
Hull F.C. matches
Grand final